Moira Junction is a   Local Nature Reserve north of Moira in Leicestershire. It is owned and managed by Leicestershire County Council.

This is part of the former Overseal railway sidings, which closed in 1966 and was developed as a nature area in 1991. It has two lakes, birch woodland and heath grassland.

There is access by a footpath from Bath Lane.

References

Local Nature Reserves in Leicestershire